God the Son is the second person of the Trinity in Christian theology. The doctrine of the Trinity identifies Jesus as the incarnation of God, united in essence (consubstantial) but distinct in person with regard to God the Father and God the Holy Spirit (the first and third persons of the Trinity).

Source

The phrase "God the Son" is not found in the Bible, but is found in later Christian sources. By scribal error the term is in one medieval manuscript, MS No.1985, where Galatians 2:20 has "Son of God" changed to "God the Son".

The term in English follows Latin usage as found in the Athanasian Creed and other texts of the early church: In Greek "God the Son" is ho Theos ho huios (ὁ Θεός ὁ υἱός) as distinct from ho huios nominative tou Theou genitive, ὁ υἱός τοῦ Θεοῦ, "Son of God". In Latin "God the Son" is Deus (nominative) Filius (nominative). The term deus filius is found in the Athanasian Creed: "Et tamen non tres omnipotentes, sed unus omnipotens. Ita Deus Pater, Deus Filius, Deus [et] Spiritus Sanctus." (distinct from filius Dei genitive "son of God"), but this phrase is also translated "So the Father is God: the Son is God: and the Holy Ghost is God".

Usage

The term deus filius is used in the Athanasian Creed and formulas such as Deus Pater, Deus Filius, Deus Spiritus Sanctus: Et non tres Dii, sed unus est Deus.

The term is used by Saint Augustine in his On the Trinity, for example in discussion of the Son's obedience to God the Father: deo patri deus filius obediens. and in Sermon 90 on the New Testament "2. For hold this fast as a firm and settled truth, if you would continue Catholics, that God the Father begot God the Son without time, and made Him of a Virgin in time."

The Augsburg Confession (1530) adopted the phrase as Gott der Sohn.

Jacques Forget (1910) in the Catholic Encyclopedia article "Holy Ghost" notes that "Among the apologists, Athenagoras mentions the Holy Ghost along with, and on the same plane as, the Father and the Son. 'Who would not be astonished', says he (A Plea for the Christians 10), 'to hear us called atheists, us who confess God the Father, God the Son and the Holy Ghost, and hold them one in power and distinct in order.' "

New Testament

"Son of God" is used to refer to Jesus in the Gospel of Mark at the beginning in verse 1:1 and at its end in chapter 15 verse 39. Max Botner wrote, "Indeed, if Mark 1:1 presents the "normative understanding" of Jesus' identity, then it makes a significant difference what the text includes".

The Logos or Word in John 1:1 ("In the beginning was the Word, and the Word was with God, and the Word was God), is often interpreted, especially by Trinitarians, to identify the pre-existent Jesus with this Word.

The disputed Comma Johanneum (1 John 5:7) includes the Son in the formula "For there are three that bear witness in heaven: the Father, the Word, and the Holy Spirit; and these three are one."

Christians believe that Jesus is the only begotten Son of God (John 3:16). Jesus identified himself in New Testament canonical writings. "Jesus said to them, 'Most assuredly, I say to you, before Abraham was, I AM.' " (John 8:58), which some Trinitarians believe is a reference to Moses in his interaction with preincarnate God in the Old Testament.  "And God said to Moses, 'I AM WHO I AM.' And He said, 'Thus you shall say to the children of Israel, "I AM has sent me to you." ' [Exodus 3:14]

A manuscript variant in John 1:18 (Θεὸν  οὐδεὶς  ἑώρακεν  πώποτε·  μονογενὴς  Θεὸς  ὁ  ὢν  εἰς  τὸν  κόλπον  τοῦ  Πατρὸς,  ἐκεῖνος  ἐξηγήσατο) has led to translations including "God the One and Only" (NIV, 1984) referring to the Son.

Later theological use of this expression (compare Latin: Deus Filius) reflects what came to be the standard interpretation of New Testament references, understood to imply Jesus' divinity, but with the distinction of his person from another person of the Trinity called the Father. As such, the title is associated more with the development of the doctrine of the Trinity.

Dissenting views
Groups of both trinitarian and antitrinitarian Christians reject the term 'God the Son' to describe Jesus Christ (as well as 'God the Holy Ghost' to describe the Holy Spirit).  Jehovah's Witnesses reject the term along with the word 'Trinity' as extrabiblical terminology, along with the Deity of Christ. 

Oneness Pentecostals, who affirm his divinity, object to the term as an unauthorized reversal of the language of Scripture which describes him 40 times as the "Son of God." The Church of Christ, which accepts both the Deity of Christ and the trinity doctrine, also avoids the term because they stress the importance to 'Call Bible things by Bible names, and talk about Bible things in Bible ways.'

While most mainstream Christian denominations hold God the Son to be "begotten of [...] the substance of" God the Father, and therefore one part of a single whole, the Church of Jesus Christ of Latter-day Saints holds that God the Father, God the Son, and God the Holy Ghost are in fact three separate beings. This is not to be confused with the Reorganized Church of Jesus Christ of Latter-day Saints, which does maintain the one-ness of the trinity.

See also
 Divi filius
 Names and titles of Jesus in the New Testament
 Sons of God

References

External links
Catholic Encyclopedia: The Blessed Trinity
The Jewish Encyclopedia: Son of God—by Kaufmann Kohler, Emil G. Hirsch
Jesus' Divinity—by christians.eu

Christian terminology
God in Christianity
Names of God in Christianity
Children by deity
Nature of Jesus Christ